Eduard Bornhöhe (pen name); born Eduard Brunberg (in Kullaaru, Rakvere Parish, Kreis Wierland – 17 November 1923, in Tallinn), was an Estonian writer.

Bornhöhe is generally considered a pioneer of the genre of the Estonian historical novel, as the majority of his creations consist of romanticism-influenced historical adventure stories.

Bibliography 
1880 Tasuja (Estonian for Avenger)
 A historical story, set during the time of the St. George's Night Uprising.  Widely considered the best story of Bornhöhe.

1890 Villu võitlused (Estonian for Battles of Villu)
 Another historical story set during the time of the St. George's Night Uprising.  More realistic and less naïve than Tasuja, with more sophisticated characters.

1892 Tallinna narrid ja narrikesed (Estonian for Big fools and little fools of Tallinn)
 A satirical series of contemporary cranks.

1893 Vürst Gabriel ehk Pirita kloostri viimsed päevad (Estonian for Furst Gabriel or The last days of Pirita monastery)
 This historical story, best known through the movie adaptation Viimne reliikvia (Estonian for The last relic), is set during a peasant uprising in the era of the Livonian War.  Due to Czarist censorship, this remained Bornhöhe's last historical story.

1899 Usurändajate radadel (Estonian for On the trail of faith travellers)
 A travel diary.

1903 Kollid (Estonian for Monsters)
 A realist short novel.

Withdrawal from publication 
In 1893, the Russian Empire's censor prohibited publication of historical stories.  This led to the eventual withdrawal of Bornhöhe from writing.  Notably, he didn't publish any books during the last twenty years of his life.

Soviet views 
Since Bornhöhe's preferred topic was Estonia's ancient fight for freedom rather than more complex or more polemical subjects, Soviets generally found his writings useful, and presented them as examples of pre-Soviet patriotism.  Vürst Gabriel ehk Pirita kloostri viimased päevad was made into a movie, the first part of Tallinna narrid ja narrikesed was repeatedly published and adapted for TV under Soviet occupation, and Bornhöhe's historical novels were constantly in lists of mandatory reading in Soviet Estonian schools.

Sources 
 Eduard Bornhöhe.  Kirjanik ja inimene, a short monograph (1961) from the series of Eesti kirjamehi by Endel Nirk

External links
 Eduard Bornhöhe at Estonian Writers' Online Dictionary

1862 births
1923 deaths
People from Rakvere Parish
People from Kreis Wierland
Estonian male novelists
19th-century Estonian novelists
20th-century Estonian novelists
Burials at Metsakalmistu